Fanta Berete (born 31 July 1975) is a French politician who has been Member of Parliament for Paris's 12th constituency since 2022. She was the substitute of Olivia Grégoire who became a government minister.

References

See also 

 List of deputies of the 16th National Assembly of France

Living people
1975 births
Deputies of the 16th National Assembly of the French Fifth Republic
Black French politicians
La République En Marche! politicians
21st-century French women politicians
Members of Parliament for Paris
Women members of the National Assembly (France)